Women in Venezuela are South American women who live in or are from Venezuela.

Issues

Violence 

In 2007, the country enacted Ley Organica Sobre el Derecho de las Mujeres a una Vida Libre de Violencia (Organic Law on the Right of Women to a Life Free of Violence).

During the crisis in Venezuela under the government of Nicolás Maduro, women in Venezuela became more vulnerable to sexual violence as a result of weak institutions and socioeconomic difficulties according to the Atlantic Council. The crisis has left Venezuelan women exposed to exploitation through sex trafficking and prostitution.

Gender roles

According to CEPAZ, women in Venezuela are at risk due to gender discrimination and the "hyper-sexualized stereotypes of Venezuelan women". The professional women and businesswomen of Venezuela generally "work hard at looking great" and they "dress to impress"; their business dress include wearing feminine attire.

Politics

20th century 
Women’s suffrage in Venezuela was first granted with the Constitution of 1947, which was considered the most politically and socially liberal compared to its predecessors. Women had started organising around the 1930s and 1940s with the death of dictator Juan Vicente Gómez. But it was not until the 1950s that women from all social classes got involved and not only middle-class women. Women also participated in the guerilla struggles during the 1960s but they did not take leading roles due to the male-dominated organisational character of these combatant groups. In the 1970s through so-called Popular Women's Circles (Círculos Femeninos Populares) women tried to organise autonomously, address the problems of poor women and assist them with health, education and employment initiatives. However, their dependence on outside funding and support of male-ruled NGOs often constrained their goals.

21st century 
With Hugo Chávez’s election for president a new constitution was adopted in 1999, which included the Article 21 that establishes the principle of equality and does not permit any discrimination "based on race, sex, creed or social standing". The Chavismo movement brought also a resurgence in women’s participation in politics and the creation of a National Institute for Women (INAMujer). This organ supervised groups such as the Bolivarian Women’s Forces (Fuerzas Bolivarianas) and the Meeting Points (Puntos de Encuentro) which consisted of women who committed to Chávez and his administration and supported the programs they were implementing. Although women were the main participants of these programs, they were not directed exclusively at women, but at the entire population.

Even though, women's mobilization increased in Chávez's Venezuela, these women were not committing to a women's agenda as other feminist groups were doing in Latin America at that time. Some Venezuelan women were focused on the defence of Chavismo, and while they did challenge some aspects of women's subordination, they also rejected the idea of identifying with feminism. Feminists were seen as public militants with antifamily and men-hating attitudes that threatened the established social order. The degree to which this rejection still holds is unknown.

The crisis in Venezuela that occurred during the tenure of Chávez's successor Nicolás Maduro resulted with women becoming more reliant on discriminatory social policies of the government, making them more vulnerable if they opposed Maduro's government.

Law

Marriage and the family
Family law was overhauled in 1982. Cohabitation has increased in Venezuela since the 1990s.

Representation
In 1997, Article 144 of the Suffrage and Political Participation Organic Act established a 30% women quota in the lists of the parliamentary candidates. In 2000 the National Electoral Council suspended this article, declaring it unconstitutional because it violated the equality principle of the Article 21. The expected consequence of this suspension was parity and an increase of the quota to 50%, but this has not been the case due to poor implementations and no measures being taken for infringements of legislations. As of 2019, 38 out of 165 deputies elected to the National Assembly are women. The number of ministries led by female politicians has decreased, compared to Chávez's final cabinet, from 39% to 24%. The Supreme Tribunal with 32 appointed judges (16 women and 16 men) is the only institution in Venezuela that presents parity of gender in its members. At the community level women are increasingly present, which is crucial in the empowerment of lower-class barrio women. Nonetheless, these female leaders of communal councils have reported that their presence is ignored at the higher levels and they are being excluded from political opportunities.

See also 

 Human trafficking in Venezuela

References

External links 

Venezuelan Women Are Dying From Buttock Injections, by Alasdair Baverstock, from The Atlantic magazine
Venezuelan Thieves Target Women’s Hair, by Claire Groden, from Time magazine

 
 
Venezuela